Emma Cox (born 10 July 1992) is an Australian sport shooter. She competed in the women's double trap event at the 2018 Commonwealth Games, winning the silver medal.

References

1992 births
Living people
Australian female sport shooters
Place of birth missing (living people)
Shooters at the 2018 Commonwealth Games
Commonwealth Games silver medallists for Australia
Commonwealth Games medallists in shooting
21st-century Australian women
Medallists at the 2018 Commonwealth Games